The Line Mountain High School is a small, rural public high school located at 187 Line Mountain Road, Herndon, Northumberland County, Pennsylvania. In 2014, the school was reorganized as a 7th–12th grade school. It shares the building with the District's only  middle school. In 2014, the enrollment was reported as 365 pupils in 9th through 12th grades. The school is the sole high school in the Line Mountain School District.

In 2013, Line Mountain Junior Senior High School was a combined junior senior high school. 
Line Mountain High school students may choose to attend Northumberland County Career Technology Center for training in the trades. The Central Susquehanna Intermediate Unit IU16 provides the district with a wide variety of services like specialized education for disabled students and hearing, speech and visual disability services, drivers education road classes, and professional development for staff and faculty.

Line Mountain High School's mascot is the Eagle and their colors are Royal Blue and Gold with a trim of Red.

Extracurriculars
Line Mountain School District offers a variety of clubs, activities and sports. The school provides a National Honor Society program for students whose GPA is 90% or higher in 10th through 12th grades.

Sports
The district provides a weight room for athletes. 
The district funds:

Boys:
Baseball – AA varsity and junior varsity teams
Basketball – AAA
Football – AA
 Soccer – A
Wrestling – AA

Girls:
Basketball – AA
Field hockey – A
Soccer – A
Softball – AA

Junior high school sports:

Boys:
Basketball
Wrestling 

Girls:
Basketball
Field hockey

According to PIAA directory July 2017 Track and field program discontinued in 2017.

References

Public high schools in Pennsylvania
Schools in Northumberland County, Pennsylvania
Public middle schools in Pennsylvania
Susquehanna Valley
High schools in Central Pennsylvania